Agnosticism is the view or belief that the existence of God, of the divine or the supernatural is unknown or unknowable. Another definition provided is the view that "human reason is incapable of providing sufficient rational grounds to justify either the belief that God exists or the belief that God does not exist."

The English biologist Thomas Henry Huxley coined the word agnostic in 1869, and said "It simply means that a man shall not say he knows or believes that which he has no scientific grounds for professing to know or believe."
Earlier thinkers, however, had written works that promoted agnostic points of view, such as Sanjaya Belatthaputta, a 5th-century BCE Indian philosopher who expressed agnosticism about any afterlife; and Protagoras, a 5th-century BCE Greek philosopher who expressed agnosticism about the existence of "the gods".

Defining agnosticism 

Being a scientist, above all else, Huxley presented agnosticism as a form of demarcation. A hypothesis with no supporting, objective, testable evidence is not an objective, scientific claim. As such, there would be no way to test said hypotheses, leaving the results inconclusive. His agnosticism was not compatible with forming a belief as to the truth, or falsehood, of the claim at hand. Karl Popper would also describe himself as an agnostic. According to philosopher William L. Rowe, in this strict sense, agnosticism is the view that human reason is incapable of providing sufficient rational grounds to justify either the belief that God exists or the belief that God does not exist.

George H. Smith, while admitting that the narrow definition of atheist was the common usage definition of that word, and admitting that the broad definition of agnostic was the common usage definition of that word, promoted broadening the definition of atheist and narrowing the definition of agnostic. Smith rejects agnosticism as a third alternative to theism and atheism and promotes terms such as agnostic atheism (the view of those who do not hold a belief in the existence of any deity, but claim that the existence of a deity is unknown or inherently unknowable) and agnostic theism (the view of those who believe in the existence of a deity(s), but claim that the existence of a deity is unknown or inherently unknowable).

Etymology
Agnostic was used by Thomas Henry Huxley in a speech at a meeting of the Metaphysical Society in 1869 to describe his philosophy, which rejects all claims of spiritual or mystical knowledge.

Early Christian church leaders used the Greek word gnosis (knowledge) to describe "spiritual knowledge". Agnosticism is not to be confused with religious views opposing the ancient religious movement of Gnosticism in particular; Huxley used the term in a broader, more abstract sense.
Huxley identified agnosticism not as a creed but rather as a method of skeptical, evidence-based inquiry.

The term Agnostic is also cognate with the Sanskrit word Ajñasi which translates literally to "not knowable", and relates to the ancient Indian philosophical school of Ajñana, which proposes that it is impossible to obtain knowledge of metaphysical nature or ascertain the truth value of philosophical propositions; and even if knowledge was possible, it is useless and disadvantageous for final salvation.

In recent years, scientific literature dealing with neuroscience and psychology has used the word to mean "not knowable".
In technical and marketing literature, "agnostic" can also mean independence from some parameters—for example, "platform agnostic" (referring to cross-platform software)
or "hardware-agnostic".

Qualifying agnosticism
Scottish Enlightenment philosopher David Hume contended that meaningful statements about the universe are always qualified by some degree of doubt. He asserted that the fallibility of human beings means that they cannot obtain absolute certainty except in trivial cases where a statement is true by definition (e.g. tautologies such as "all bachelors are unmarried" or "all triangles have three corners").

Types
Strong agnosticism (also called "hard", "closed", "strict", or "permanent agnosticism") The view that the question of the existence or nonexistence of a deity or deities, and the nature of ultimate reality is unknowable by reason of our natural inability to verify any experience with anything but another subjective experience. A strong agnostic would say, "I cannot know whether a deity exists or not, and neither can you."
Weak agnosticism (also called "soft", "open", "empirical", "hopeful" or "temporal agnosticism") The view that the existence or nonexistence of any deities is currently unknown but is not necessarily unknowable; therefore, one will withhold judgment until evidence, if any, becomes available. A weak agnostic would say, "I don't know whether any deities exist or not, but maybe one day, if there is evidence, we can find something out."
Apathetic agnosticism The view that no amount of debate can prove or disprove the existence of one or more deities, and if one or more deities exist, they do not appear to be concerned about the fate of humans. Therefore, their existence has little to no impact on personal human affairs and should be of little interest. An apathetic agnostic would say, "I don't know whether any deity exists or not, and I don't care if any deity exists or not."

History

Hindu philosophy

Throughout the history of Hinduism there has been a strong tradition of philosophic speculation and skepticism.

The Rig Veda takes an agnostic view on the fundamental question of how the universe and the gods were created. Nasadiya Sukta (Creation Hymn) in the tenth chapter of the Rig Veda says:

Hume, Kant, and Kierkegaard
Aristotle,
Anselm,
Aquinas,
Descartes,
and Gödel
presented arguments attempting to rationally prove the existence of God. The skeptical empiricism of David Hume, the antinomies of Immanuel Kant, and the existential philosophy of Søren Kierkegaard convinced many later philosophers to abandon these attempts, regarding it impossible to construct any unassailable proof for the existence or non-existence of God.

In his 1844 book, Philosophical Fragments, Kierkegaard writes:

Hume was Huxley's favourite philosopher, calling him "the Prince of Agnostics". Diderot wrote to his mistress, telling of a visit by Hume to the Baron D'Holbach, and describing how a word for the position that Huxley would later describe as agnosticism did not seem to exist, or at least was not common knowledge, at the time.

United Kingdom

Charles Darwin

Raised in a religious environment, Charles Darwin (1809–1882) studied to be an Anglican clergyman. While eventually doubting parts of his faith, Darwin continued to help in church affairs, even while avoiding church attendance. Darwin stated that it would be "absurd to doubt that a man might be an ardent theist and an evolutionist". Although reticent about his religious views, in 1879 he wrote that "I have never been an atheist in the sense of denying the existence of a God. – I think that generally ... an agnostic would be the most correct description of my state of mind."

Thomas Henry Huxley

Agnostic views are as old as philosophical skepticism, but the terms agnostic and agnosticism were created by Huxley (1825–1895) to sum up his thoughts on contemporary developments of metaphysics about the "unconditioned" (William Hamilton) and the "unknowable" (Herbert Spencer). Though Huxley began to use the term "agnostic" in 1869, his opinions had taken shape some time before that date. In a letter of September 23, 1860, to Charles Kingsley, Huxley discussed his views extensively:

And again, to the same correspondent, May 6, 1863:

Of the origin of the name agnostic to describe this attitude, Huxley gave the following account:

In 1889, Huxley wrote:

William Stewart Ross
William Stewart Ross (1844–1906) wrote under the name of Saladin. He was associated with Victorian Freethinkers and the organization the British Secular Union. He edited the Secular Review from 1882; it was renamed Agnostic Journal and Eclectic Review and closed in 1907. Ross championed agnosticism in opposition to the atheism of Charles Bradlaugh as an open-ended spiritual exploration.

In Why I am an Agnostic he claims that agnosticism is "the very reverse of atheism".

Bertrand Russell

Bertrand Russell (1872–1970) declared Why I Am Not a Christian in 1927, a classic statement of agnosticism.
He calls upon his readers to "stand on their own two feet and look fair and square at the world with a fearless attitude and a free intelligence".

In 1939, Russell gave a lecture on The existence and nature of God, in which he characterized himself as an atheist. He said:

However, later in the same lecture, discussing modern non-anthropomorphic concepts of God, Russell states:

In Russell's 1947 pamphlet, Am I An Atheist or an Agnostic? (subtitled A Plea For Tolerance in the Face of New Dogmas), he ruminates on the problem of what to call himself:

In his 1953 essay, What Is An Agnostic? Russell states:

Later in the essay, Russell adds:

Leslie Weatherhead

In 1965, Christian theologian Leslie Weatherhead (1893–1976) published The Christian Agnostic, in which he argues:

Although radical and unpalatable to conventional theologians, Weatherhead's agnosticism falls far short of Huxley's, and short even of weak agnosticism:

United States

Robert G. Ingersoll

Robert G. Ingersoll (1833–1899), an Illinois lawyer and politician who evolved into a well-known and sought-after orator in 19th-century America, has been referred to as the "Great Agnostic".

In an 1896 lecture titled Why I Am An Agnostic, Ingersoll related why he was an agnostic:

In the conclusion of the speech he simply sums up the agnostic position as:

In 1885, Ingersoll explained his comparative view of agnosticism and atheism as follows:

Bernard Iddings Bell 
Canon Bernard Iddings Bell (1886–1958), a popular cultural commentator, Episcopal priest, and author, lauded the necessity of agnosticism in Beyond Agnosticism: A Book for Tired Mechanists, calling it the foundation of "all intelligent Christianity". Agnosticism was a temporary mindset in which one rigorously questioned the truths of the age, including the way in which one believed God. His view of Robert Ingersoll and Thomas Paine was that they were not denouncing true Christianity but rather "a gross perversion of it". Part of the misunderstanding stemmed from ignorance of the concepts of God and religion. Historically, a god was any real, perceivable force that ruled the lives of humans and inspired admiration, love, fear, and homage; religion was the practice of it. Ancient peoples worshiped gods with real counterparts, such as Mammon (money and material things), Nabu (rationality), or Ba'al (violent weather); Bell argued that modern peoples were still paying homage—with their lives and their children's lives—to these old gods of wealth, physical appetites, and self-deification. Thus, if one attempted to be agnostic passively, he or she would incidentally join the worship of the world's gods.

In Unfashionable Convictions (1931), he criticized the Enlightenment's complete faith in human sensory perception, augmented by scientific instruments, as a means of accurately grasping Reality. Firstly, it was fairly new, an innovation of the Western World, which Aristotle invented and Thomas Aquinas revived among the scientific community. Secondly, the divorce of "pure" science from human experience, as manifested in American Industrialization, had completely altered the environment, often disfiguring it, so as to suggest its insufficiency to human needs. Thirdly, because scientists were constantly producing more data—to the point where no single human could grasp it all at once—it followed that human intelligence was incapable of attaining a complete understanding of universe; therefore, to admit the mysteries of the unobserved universe was to be actually scientific.

Bell believed that there were two other ways that humans could perceive and interact with the world. Artistic experience was how one expressed meaning through speaking, writing, painting, gesturing—any sort of communication which shared insight into a human's inner reality. Mystical experience was how one could "read" people and harmonize with them, being what we commonly call love. In summary, man was a scientist, artist, and lover. Without exercising all three, a person became "lopsided".

Bell considered a humanist to be a person who cannot rightly ignore the other ways of knowing. However, humanism, like agnosticism, was also temporal, and would eventually lead to either scientific materialism or theism. He lays out the following thesis:

 Truth cannot be discovered by reasoning on the evidence of scientific data alone. Modern peoples' dissatisfaction with life is the result of depending on such incomplete data. Our ability to reason is not a way to discover Truth but rather a way to organize our knowledge and experiences somewhat sensibly. Without a full, human perception of the world, one's reason tends to lead them in the wrong direction.
 Beyond what can be measured with scientific tools, there are other types of perception, such as one's ability know another human through loving. One's loves cannot be dissected and logged in a scientific journal, but we know them far better than we know the surface of the sun. They show us an undefinable reality that is nevertheless intimate and personal, and they reveal qualities lovelier and truer than detached facts can provide.
 To be religious, in the Christian sense, is to live for the Whole of Reality (God) rather than for a small part (gods). Only by treating this Whole of Reality as a person—good and true and perfect—rather than an impersonal force, can we come closer to the Truth. An ultimate Person can be loved, but a cosmic force cannot. A scientist can only discover peripheral truths, but a lover is able to get at the Truth.
 There are many reasons to believe in God but they are not sufficient for an agnostic to become a theist. It is not enough to believe in an ancient holy book, even though when it is accurately analyzed without bias, it proves to be more trustworthy and admirable than what we are taught in school. Neither is it enough to realize how probable it is that a personal God would have to show human beings how to live, considering they have so much trouble on their own. Nor is it enough to believe for the reason that, throughout history, millions of people have arrived at this Wholeness of Reality only through religious experience. The aforementioned reasons may warm one toward religion, but they fall short of convincing. However, if one presupposes that God is in fact a knowable, loving person, as an experiment, and then lives according that religion, he or she will suddenly come face to face with experiences previously unknown. One's life becomes full, meaningful, and fearless in the face of death. It does not defy reason but exceeds it.
 Because God has been experienced through love, the orders of prayer, fellowship, and devotion now matter. They create order within one's life, continually renewing the "missing piece" that had previously felt lost. They empower one to be compassionate and humble, not small-minded or arrogant.
 No truth should be denied outright, but all should be questioned. Science reveals an ever-growing vision of our universe that should not be discounted due to bias toward older understandings. Reason is to be trusted and cultivated. To believe in God is not to forego reason or to deny scientific facts, but to step into the unknown and discover the fullness of life.

Demographics

Demographic research services normally do not differentiate between various types of non-religious respondents, so agnostics are often classified in the same category as atheists or other non-religious people.

A 2010 survey published in Encyclopædia Britannica found that the non-religious people or the agnostics made up about 9.6% of the world's population.
A November–December 2006 poll published in the Financial Times gives rates for the United States and five European countries. The rates of agnosticism in the United States were at 14%, while the rates of agnosticism in the European countries surveyed were considerably higher: Italy (20%), Spain (30%), Great Britain (35%), Germany (25%), and France (32%).

A study conducted by the Pew Research Center found that about 16% of the world's people, the third largest group after Christianity and Islam, have no religious affiliation.
According to a 2012 report by the Pew Research Center, agnostics made up 3.3% of the US adult population.
In the U.S. Religious Landscape Survey, conducted by the Pew Research Center, 55% of agnostic respondents expressed "a belief in God or a universal spirit",
whereas 41% stated that they thought that they felt a tension "being non-religious in a society where most people are religious".

According to the 2011 Australian Bureau of Statistics, 22% of Australians have "no religion", a category that includes agnostics.
Between 64% and 65%
of Japanese and up to 81%
of Vietnamese are atheists, agnostics, or do not believe in a god. An official European Union survey reported that 3% of the EU population is unsure about their belief in a god or spirit.

Criticism
Agnosticism is criticized from a variety of standpoints. Some atheists criticize the use of the term agnosticism as functionally indistinguishable from atheism; this results in frequent criticisms of those who adopt the term as avoiding the atheist label.

Theistic
Theistic critics claim that agnosticism is impossible in practice, since a person can live only either as if God did not exist (etsi deus non-daretur), or as if God did exist (etsi deus daretur).

Christian
According to Pope Benedict XVI, strong agnosticism in particular contradicts itself in affirming the power of reason to know scientific truth. He blames the exclusion of reasoning from religion and ethics for dangerous pathologies such as crimes against humanity and ecological disasters.
"Agnosticism", said Benedict, "is always the fruit of a refusal of that knowledge which is in fact offered to man ... The knowledge of God has always existed". He asserted that agnosticism is a choice of comfort, pride, dominion, and utility over truth, and is opposed by the following attitudes: the keenest self-criticism, humble listening to the whole of existence, the persistent patience and self-correction of the scientific method, a readiness to be purified by the truth.

The Catholic Church sees merit in examining what it calls "partial agnosticism", specifically those systems that "do not aim at constructing a complete philosophy of the unknowable, but at excluding special kinds of truth, notably religious, from the domain of knowledge". However, the Church is historically opposed to a full denial of the capacity of human reason to know God. The Council of the Vatican declares, "God, the beginning and end of all, can, by the natural light of human reason, be known with certainty from the works of creation".

Blaise Pascal argued that even if there were truly no evidence for God, agnostics should consider what is now known as Pascal's Wager: the infinite expected value of acknowledging God is always greater than the finite expected value of not acknowledging his existence, and thus it is a safer "bet" to choose God.

Atheistic
According to Richard Dawkins, a distinction between agnosticism and atheism is unwieldy and depends on how close to zero a person is willing to rate the probability of existence for any given god-like entity. About himself, Dawkins continues, "I am agnostic only to the extent that I am agnostic about fairies at the bottom of the garden." Dawkins also identifies two categories of agnostics; "Temporary Agnostics in Practice" (TAPs), and "Permanent Agnostics in Principle" (PAPs). He states that "agnosticism about the existence of God belongs firmly in the temporary or TAP category. Either he exists or he doesn't. It is a scientific question; one day we may know the answer, and meanwhile we can say something pretty strong about the probability" and considers PAP a "deeply inescapable kind of fence-sitting".

Ignosticism
A related concept is ignosticism, the view that a coherent definition of a deity must be put forward before the question of the existence of a deity can be meaningfully discussed. If the chosen definition is not coherent, the ignostic holds the noncognitivist view that the existence of a deity is meaningless or empirically untestable. A. J. Ayer, Theodore Drange, and other philosophers see both atheism and agnosticism as incompatible with ignosticism on the grounds that atheism and agnosticism accept the statement "a deity exists" as a meaningful proposition that can be argued for or against.

See also

References

Further reading
 
 Alexander, Nathan G. "An Atheist with a Tall Hat On: The Forgotten History of Agnosticism." The Humanist, February 19, 2019. 
 Annan, Noel. Leslie Stephen: The Godless Victorian (U of Chicago Press, 1984)
 Cockshut, A.O.J. The Unbelievers, English Thought, 1840–1890 (1966).
 Dawkins, Richard. "The poverty of agnosticism", in The God Delusion, Black Swan, 2007.
 
 
 
 
 Lightman, Bernard. The Origins of Agnosticism (1987).
 Royle, Edward. Radicals, Secularists, and Republicans: Popular Freethought in Britain, 1866–1915 (Manchester UP, 1980).

External links 

 
 
 
 Albert Einstein on Religion Shapell Manuscript Foundation
 Why I Am An Agnostic by Robert G. Ingersoll, [1896].
 Dictionary of the History of Ideas: Agnosticism
 Agnosticism from INTERS – Interdisciplinary Encyclopedia of Religion and Science
 Agnosticism – from ReligiousTolerance.org
 What do Agnostics Believe? – A Jewish perspective
 Fides et Ratio  – the relationship between faith and reason Karol Wojtyla [1998]
 The Natural Religion by Dr Brendan Connolly, 2008
 

 
Epistemological theories
Philosophy of religion
Skepticism
Irreligion
Doubt
Freedom of religion
Philosophical schools and traditions